The Sault Sainte Marie Air Defense Sector (SsmADS) is an inactive United States Air Force organization.  Its last assignment was with the 30th Air Division,  being stationed at K.I. Sawyer Air Force Base, Michigan.

History 
SsmADS was established in November 1958 assuming control of former ADC Central Air Defense Force units in Wisconsin and the Upper Peninsula of Michigan.  The organization provided command and control over several aircraft and radar squadrons.

On 15 June 1960, the new Semi Automatic Ground Environment (SAGE) Direction Center (DC-14) became operational.    DC-14  was equipped with dual AN/FSQ-7 Computers.   The day-to-day operations of the command was to train and maintain tactical flying units flying jet interceptor aircraft (F-94 Starfire; F-102 Delta Dagger; F-106 Delta Dart) in a state of readiness with training missions and series of exercises with SAC and other units simulating interceptions of incoming enemy aircraft.

The Sector was inactivated on 1 April 1966 as part of an ADC consolidation and reorganization; and its units were reassigned to the 28th and 29th Air Divisions.

Lineage 
 Established as Sault Sainte Marie Air Defense Sector on 8 November 1958
 Inactivated on 15 December 1963

Assignments 
 37th Air Division, 8 November 1958
 30th Air Division, 1 April 1959 – 15 December 1963

Stations 
 K.I. Sawyer Air Force Base, Michigan, 8 November 1958 – 15 December 1963

Components

Wings
 56th Fighter Wing (Air Defense)
 K. I. Sawyer AFB, Michigan, 1 February 1961-1 October 1963
 507th Fighter Wing (Air Defense)
 Kincheloe AFB, Michigan, 1 February 1961-1 October 1963

Groups 
 56th Fighter Group (Air Defense)
 K. I. Sawyer AFB, Michigan, 1 April 1960-1 February 1961
 507th Fighter Group (Air Defense)
 Kincheloe AFB, Michigan, 1 April 1960-1 February 1961

Interceptor squadron 
 445th Fighter-Interceptor Squadron
 Wurtsmith AFB, Michigan, 1 April 1960-15 July 1963

Missile squadron 
 37th Air Defense Missile Squadron (BOMARC)
 Kincheloe AFB, Michigan, 1 April 1960-1 October 1963

Radar squadrons 

 639th Aircraft Control and Warning Squadron
 Lowther AS, Ontario, 1 April 1960-1 July 1963
 665th Radar Squadron
 Calumet AFS, Michigan, 1 April 1960-1 October 1963
 676th Radar Squadron
 Antigo AFS, Wisconsin, 1 April 1960-1 October 1963
 752d Radar Squadron
 Empire AFS, Michigan, 1 April 1960-15 July 1963

 753d Radar Squadron
 Sault Sainte Marie AFS, Michigan, 1 April 1960-1 October 1963
 912th Aircraft Control and Warning Squadron
 Ramore AS, Ontario, 1 April 1960-1 January 1962
 913th Aircraft Control and Warning Squadron
 Pagwa AS, Ontario, 1 April 1960-1 June 1963

See also
 List of USAF Aerospace Defense Command General Surveillance Radar Stations
 Aerospace Defense Command Fighter Squadrons

References

 Lloyd H. Cornett and Mildred W. Johnson, A Handbook of Aerospace Defense Organization 1946 - 1980, Office of History, Aerospace Defense Center, Peterson Air Force Base, Colorado.
 Winkler, David F. (1997), Searching the skies: the legacy of the United States Cold War defense radar program. Prepared for United States Air Force Headquarters Air Combat Command.
 Ravenstein, Charles A. (1984). Air Force Combat Wings Lineage and Honors Histories 1947–1977. Maxwell AFB, Alabama: Office of Air Force History. .
 Radomes.org Sault Sainte Marie Air Defense Sector

Air Defense
1958 establishments in Michigan
1966 disestablishments in Michigan
Military units and formations disestablished in 1966
Military units and formations in Michigan